The 1896 Greensburg Athletic Association season was their seventh season in existence. The team finished 6–1–1.

Schedule

Game notes

References

Greensburg Athletic Association
Greensburg Athletic Association seasons
Greensburg Athletic Association